The 1977 NAIA World Series was the 21st annual tournament hosted by the National Association of Intercollegiate Athletics to determine the national champion of baseball among its member colleges and universities in the United States and Canada.

The tournament was again played at Phil Welch Stadium in St. Joseph, Missouri.

David Lipscomb (47–12) defeated Southeastern Oklahoma State (56–8) in a single-game championship series, 2–1, to win the Bisons' first NAIA World Series. For the first time in event history, both teams reached the final despite having lost a game earlier in the tournament. 

David Lipscomb pitcher/first-baseman/designated hitter Steve Fletcher was named tournament MVP.

Bracket

See also
 1977 NCAA Division I baseball tournament
 1977 NCAA Division II baseball tournament
 1977 NCAA Division III baseball tournament

Reference

|NAIA World Series
NAIA World Series
NAIA World Series
NAIA World Series